Gerald Chibueze Diyoke (born March 11, 1996) is a Nigerian footballer who plays as a midfielder for HNK Cibalia.

Club career
Gerald moved to Rijeka in early 2014 from its affiliate in Nigeria, the Abuja Football College Academy, following in the footsteps of several of his compatriots. In April 2014, he signed his first contract with HNK Rijeka that ties him with the club until the end of 2016. In his first season with the club, Gerald played for Rijeka Reserves in the Croatian Third Football League. With 28 appearances, he was the most capped Rijeka II player during 2014–15. In the first half of the 2015–16 season, Gerald was a regular starter for Rijeka II, missing only one match due to suspension.

In January 2016, Gerald was one of several Rijeka II players who were brought in to the first-team's pre-season training camp in Dubai. He was capped in four of Rijeka’s mid-season friendlies and subsequently included in the first-team squad. On 14 May 2016, he made his official debut for the first team, when he entered as a substitute in a home win against Istra 1961 in the final round of the 2015–16 Croatian First Football League. In January 2017, Gerald was loaned to HNK Šibenik in Croatian Second Football League until the end of the season.

References

External links

HNK Rijeka player profile 

1996 births
Living people
Sportspeople from Kaduna
Association football midfielders
Nigerian footballers
HNK Rijeka players
HNK Rijeka II players
HNK Šibenik players
NK Krško players
NK Dugopolje players
NK Brežice 1919 players
HNK Cibalia players
Croatian Football League players
First Football League (Croatia) players
Slovenian PrvaLiga players
Slovenian Second League players
Nigerian expatriate footballers
Expatriate footballers in Croatia
Nigerian expatriate sportspeople in Croatia
Expatriate footballers in Slovenia
Nigerian expatriate sportspeople in Slovenia